Sabrina Goleš and Judith Wiesner were the defending champions, but none competed this year. Goleš chose to focus on the singles tournament only.

Sandra Cecchini and Patricia Tarabini won the title by defeating Silke Meier and Elena Pampoulova 4–6, 6–4, 6–2 in the final.

Seeds

Draw

Draw

References

External links
 Official results archive (ITF)
 Official results archive (WTA)

Athens Trophy
1989 WTA Tour